Valentino is an Italian male given name, the masculine equivalent of the female givne name Valentina. It may be abbreviated as "Vale" or "Tino". The equivalent English male given name is Valentine. A surname, Valentino, also exists.

People named Valentino include:

Given named

 Valentino Argento (1901–1941), Italian Olympic fencer
 Valentino d'Apreja (died 1539), Italian Roman Catholic bishop
 Valentino Babini (1889–1952), Italian general
 Valentino Balboni (born 1959), Italian test driver for Lambourghini
 Valentino Baldi (1774–1816), Italian painter
 Valentino Panciera Besarel (1829–1902), Italian sculptor
 Valentino Bellucci (born 1975), Italian philosopher
 Valentino Bertolini (1917–1967), Italian Olympic racewalker
 Valentino Blake (born 1990), U.S. American football player
 Valentino Bocca (born 2002/2003), Italian child who was the centre of an Italian court case where the court ruled that MMR vaccination caused autism
 Valentino Bompiani (1898–1992), Italian writer
 Valentino Bong (born 1989), Malaysian squash player
 Valentino Borgia (born 1914), Italian Olympic Graeco-Roman wrestler
 Valentino Braitenberg (1926–2011), Italian cyberneticist
 Valentino Bucchi (1916–1976), Italian composer
 Valentino Castellani (born 1940), Italian politician
 Valentino Degani (1905–1974), Italian soccer player
 Valentino Achak Deng, Sudanese child refugee to the United States
 Valentino Fiévet (born 1991; frequently known mononymously as "Valentino"), French soccer player
 Valentino Fioravanti (1764–1837), Italian composer
 Valentino Fois (1973–2008), Italian cyclist
 Valentino Furlanetto (born 1965), Italian motorcycle speedway rider
 Valentino Gallo (born 1985), Italian water polo player
 Valentino Garavani (born 1932; frequently known mononymously as "Valentino"), Italian fashion designer
 Valentino Gasparella (born 1935), Italian track cyclist
 Valentino Giambelli (1928–2019), Italian soccer player
 Valentino Grant (born 1964), Italian politician
 Valentino Kanzyani, Slovenian DJ and music producer
 Valentino Khan (born 1987), U.S. DJ and music producer
 Valentino Knowles (born 1988), Bahamian boxer
 Valentino Lai (born 1985), Italian-Swede soccer player
 Valentino Lazaro (born 1996), Austrian soccer player
 Valentino Lanús (born 1975), Mexican actor
 Valentino Francisco Livramento (born 2002), British soccer player
 Valentino Macchi (1937–2013), Italian actor
 Valentino Manfredonia (born 1989), Brazilian-Italian boxer
 Valentino Mapapalangi (born 1993), Tongan rugby player
 Valentino Mario Maurizio Moris (1860–1944), Italian general, politician, aviation pioneer
 Valentino Mastrozzi (1729–1809), Italian Roman Catholic cardinal
 Valentino Mazzia (1922–1999), U.S. anesthesiologist, medical doctor and forensic doctor
 Valentino Mazzola (1919–1949), Italian soccer player
 Valentino Miller (also known mononymously as "Valentino"), U.S rapper
 Valentino Mokiwa (born 1954), Tanzanian Anglican archbishop
 Valentino Müller (born 1999), Austrian soccer player
 Valentino Murataj (born 1996), Albanian soccer player
 Valentino Musetti (born 1943), Italian-British stuntman
 Valentino Nucci, U.S. mafioso, member of the Gambino crime family
 Valentino Orsini (1927–2001), Italian director
 Valentino Orsolini Cencelli (1898–1971), Italian politician
 Valentino Pascucci (born 1978), U.S. baseball player
 Valentino Annibale Pastore (1868–1956), Italian philosopher
 Valentino Pellarini (1919–1972), Italian Olympic basketball player
 Valentino Piacentini (born 1978), Italian pingpong player
 Valentino Picone (born 1971), Italian comedian
 Valentino Pittoni (1872–1933), Italian politician
 Valentino Pozzoli, Italian astronomer
 Valentino Puccio (1965–2011), U.S. pro-wrestler
 Valentino Pugliese (born 1997), Swiss soccer player
 Valentino Ravnić (born 1995), Croatian soccer player
 Valentino Rossi (born 1979), Italian MotoGP motorcycle racer, multiple world champion
 Valentino Rovisi (1715—1783), Italian painter
 Valentino Sala (1908—2002), Italian soccer player
 Valentino Siani (1595–1672), Italian violinmaker
 Valentino Stepčić (born 1990), Croatian soccer player
 Valentino Talluto, Italian convicted for multiple criminal transmissions of HIV
 Valentino Telaubun (born 1984), Indonesian soccer player
 Valentino Tontodonati (born 1959), Italian rower
 Valentino Riroroko Tuki (1932—2017), Rapa Nuian pretender to the throne
 Valentino Urbani (1690–1722), Italian alto castrato singer
 Valentino Valentini (died 1593), Italian Roman Catholic bishop
 Valentino Vermeulen (born 2001), Dutch soccer player
 Valentino Vujinović (born 1999), German soccer player
 Valentino Yuel (born 1994), South Sudanese soccer player
 Valentino Zeichen (1938—2016), Italian poet
 Valentino Zucchetti, ballet dancer

Pseudonymed
 Valentino, the stage name for Peter González Torres of the Puerto Rican band Magnate & Valentino
 Duke of Valentino, mononymously called "Valentino"
 Cesare Borgia (1475–1507), Spanish-Italian soldier, nobleman, politician, and cardinal

Fictional characters
 Valentino, a fictional character from the Argentinian-Columbian Spanish-language telenovela Valentino el argentino
 Valentino, a fictional character from the adult animated web series Hazbin Hotel ; see List of Hazbin Hotel and Helluva Boss characters
 Valentino Calavera, a main character in Cartoon Network animated series Victor and Valentino

See also

 Valentinos, Greek male given name
 
 Valentino (disambiguation)
 Valentina (disambiguation)
 Valentine (disambiguation)
 Valentini (disambiguation)
 Valentin (disambiguation)
 Vale (disambiguation)
 Tino (disambiguation)

Italian given names